Herefoss is a former municipality in the old Aust-Agder county in Norway. The municipality existed from 1838 until its dissolution in 1967 when it was merged into Birkenes municipality in what is now Agder county. Herefoss was a  area surrounding the Herefossfjorden (part of the river Tovdalselva). The administrative centre was the village of Herefoss where the Herefoss Church is located. The other main village was Søre Herefoss, located in the southern part of the municipality.

History
The municipality of Heirefos was established on 1 January 1838 (see formannskapsdistrikt law). In 1900, 610 people lived in the municipality on 67 different farms. During the 1960s, there were many municipal mergers across Norway due to the work of the Schei Committee. On 1 January 1967, Herefoss (population: 585) was merged with the neighboring municipalities of Birkenes (population: 1,883) and Vegusdal (population: 582), forming the new municipality of Birkenes with its administrative centre located at Birkeland. 

Herefoss was historically the seat of public officials in this region. The fogd resided here from 1680 to 1820, and the sorenskriver (district judge) also lived here from 1724 to 1852. Herefoss was established as a prestegjeld in 1875. Herefoss Church was consecrated by Bishop Jacob von der Lippe in 1865.

Name
The first documented occurrence of the name Hegrafoss stems from 1487, and the Old Norse form of the name must then have been . The first element is the genitive case of the bird name hegri (grey heron) (same as the local river name, Hegra), and the last element is fors which means "waterfall".  Later, it was spelled Heirefos and ultimately Herefoss.

Government
All municipalities in Norway, including Herefoss, are responsible for primary education (through 10th grade), outpatient health services, senior citizen services, unemployment and other social services, zoning, economic development, and municipal roads. The municipality was governed by a municipal council of elected representatives, which in turn elected a mayor.

Municipal council
The municipal council  of Herefoss was made up of 13 representatives that were elected to four year terms.  The party breakdown of the final municipal council was as follows:

See also
List of former municipalities of Norway

References

Birkenes
Former municipalities of Norway
1838 establishments in Norway
1967 disestablishments in Norway